Petre Popa (born 7 May 1958, Tătărăuca Veche) is a writer and activist from Moldova. He served as the head of the Department of Culture of the Soroca District (1999–2007) and has been the director of the Theater "Veniamin Apostol" in Soroca since 2009. Petre Popa is a member of the Moldovan Writers' Union.

Awards
 Petre Popa was awarded, by a presidential decree, with Romania's highest state decoration – the Order of the Star of Romania. 
 Laureat al Festivalului naţional de poezie din Sighetu Marmaţiei, 1990.

Works
 Apariţii: „Rădăcina aripilor”, Chişinău, 1993; 
 „Prinţul moştenitor”, Bucharest, 1998; 
 „Puiul ursului de circ”, Chişinău, 1999;
 „Intuiţie”, Chişinău, 2000; 
 „Ritmuri şi anotimpuri”. Poezii şi cântece pentru copii, Buzău, 2007
 „AiciUndeva”, Chişinău, 2008; 
 „Dor pribeag, cântece”, Chişinău, 2009; 
 „Asimetrii, poeme”, Chişinău, 2009.

References

External links 
 Popa Petre 
 Timpul de dimineaţă, Teatrul „Veniamin Apostol” a debutat cu dreptul

1958 births
Moldovan writers
Moldovan male writers
Moldovan activists
Living people